Qarkhotlu (also Romanized as Qārkhotlū; also known as Karkhurta, Qarakhurtali, Qārkhowdlū, Qārkhūdlū, Qārkhūtlī, Qārkhūtlū, and Qārkhvodlū) is a village in Ijrud-e Bala Rural District, in the Central District of Ijrud County, Zanjan Province, Iran. At the 2006 census, its population was 555, in 136 families.

References 

Populated places in Ijrud County